Angers is a city in the Maine-et-Loire department in western France.

Angers may also refer to:

Places 
 Angers, Masson-Angers, Gatineau, Quebec, Canada
 Arrondissement of Angers, Maine-et-Loire department, France
Angers – Loire Airport

Rivers
 Bras des Angers, Quebec, Canada
 Angers River, Quebec, Canada

Other uses 
 Angers SCO, a French football club
 Angers (meteorite), that hit France in 1822
 Angers (surname), including a list of people with the name

See also

 Anger (disambiguation)